The 1994 United States House of Representatives elections were held on November 8, 1994, to elect U.S. Representatives to serve in the 104th United States Congress. They occurred in the middle of President Bill Clinton's first term. In what was known as the Republican Revolution, a 54-seat swing in membership from the Democratic Party to the Republican Party resulted in the latter gaining a majority of seats in the House of Representatives for the first time since 1952. It was also the largest seat gain for the party since 1946, and the largest for either party since 1948, and characterized a political realignment in American politics.

Democrats had run the House since 1955, and for all but four years (1947–49 and 1953–55) since 1931. But in 1994 the Republican Party ran against President Clinton's proposed healthcare reform. The Republicans argued that Clinton had abandoned the centrist New Democrat platform he campaigned on during the 1992 Presidential election and reverted to big government solutions. The GOP ran on Newt Gingrich's Contract with America.

The incumbent Speaker of the House, Democrat Tom Foley, lost re-election in his district, becoming the first sitting Speaker to do so since Galusha Grow in 1863. Other major upsets included the defeat of powerful long-serving Representatives such as Ways and Means Chairman Dan Rostenkowski and Judiciary Chairman Jack Brooks. In all, 34 incumbents, all Democrats, were defeated. Republicans also won a number of seats held by retiring Democrats. No Republican incumbents lost re-election, but Democrats won four open Republican-held seats. NFL Hall of Famer Steve Largent was elected in Oklahoma and singer Sonny Bono was elected in California.

Robert H. Michel, the Republican Minority Leader, chose to retire due to pressure from the more conservative members of the Republican caucus. Dick Cheney had served as the Minority Whip and Michel supported having Edward Rell Madigan replace him, but the position was instead given to Gingrich, who would later be selected to become Speaker. The incumbent Democratic Majority Leader, Dick Gephardt, became Minority Leader. The new House leadership, under the Republicans, promised to bring a dozen legislative proposals to a vote in the first 100 days of the session, although the Senate did not always follow suit. In a significant political realignment, the South underwent a dramatic transformation. Before the election, House Democrats outnumbered House Republicans in the South. Afterwards, with the Republicans having picked up a total of 19 Southern seats, they were able to outnumber Democrats in the South for the first time since Reconstruction. The Republicans would go on to remain the majority party of the House for the following 12 years, until the 2006 elections. The Republicans have won at least 200 seats in every single House election since, with the sole exception of 2008.

, this is the last congressional election in which Democrats won a House seat in Montana, as well as the last time Republicans won any House seats in Massachusetts.

Voting patterns

Republican gains, 1992–1994

Source: Data from exit-poll surveys by Voter Research and Surveys and Mitofsky International published in The New York Times, November 13, 1994, p. 24.

Religious right
Evangelicals were an important group within the electorate and a significant voting block in the Republican party. The national exit poll by Mitofsky International showed 27% of all voters identified themselves as a born-again or evangelical Christians, up from 18% in 1988 and 24% in 1992. Republican House candidates outpolled Democrats among white evangelicals by a massive 52 points, 76% to 24%.

According to a survey sponsored by the Christian Coalition, 33 percent of the 1994 voters were "religious conservatives," up from 24 percent in 1992 and 18 percent in 1988 (CQ Weekly Report), November 19, 1994, p. 3364; in the 1994 exit poll, 38 percent identified themselves as "conservatives," compared with 30 percent in 1992.

Party identification and ideology by selected religious groups 1994

Source: Mitofsky International exit poll in Klinkner, p. 121.

Overall results

Source: Election Statistics - Office of the Clerk

Incumbents defeated 
Every Republican incumbent standing won re-election.

Democrats 
Thirty-four incumbent Democrats (including 16 "freshmen") were defeated in 1994. Democrats from Washington lost the most seats (5).
 
 : Karan English
 : Dan Hamburg
 : Richard H. Lehman
 : Lynn Schenk
 : George Darden
 : Don Johnson Jr.
 : Larry LaRocco
 : Dan Rostenkowski
 : Jill Long
 : Frank McCloskey
 : Neal Edward Smith
 : Dan Glickman
 : Thomas Barlow
 : Peter Hoagland
 : James Bilbray
 : Richard Swett
 : Herb Klein
 : George J. Hochbrueckner
 : Martin Lancaster
 : David Price
 : David S. Mann
 : Ted Strickland
 : Eric Fingerhut
 : Marjorie Margolies-Mezvinsky
 : Jack Brooks
 : Bill Sarpalius
 : Karen Shepherd
 : Leslie Byrne
 : Maria Cantwell
 : Jolene Unsoeld
 : Jay Inslee
 : Tom Foley
 : Mike Kreidler
 : Peter W. Barca

Republicans 
 None.

Open seats that changed parties

Democratic seats won by Republicans 
22 open seats previously held by Democrats were won by Republicans.

 : Matt Salmon
 : Joe Scarborough
 : Dave Weldon
 : Saxby Chambliss
 : Jerry Weller
 : David M. McIntosh
 : Sam Brownback
 : James B. Longley Jr.
 : Dick Chrysler
 : Gil Gutknecht
 : Roger Wicker
 : Frank LoBiondo
 : David Funderburk
 : Richard Burr
 : Bob Ney
 : Tom Coburn
 : J. C. Watts
 : Jim Bunn
 : Lindsey Graham
 : Zach Wamp
 : Van Hilleary
 : Jack Metcalf

Republican seats won by Democrats 
Democrats won four open seats previously held by Republicans.

 : John Baldacci
 : Bill Luther
 : Mike Doyle
 : Patrick J. Kennedy

Open seats that parties held

Democratic seats held 
Democrats held nine of their open seats.

 : Zoe Lofgren
 : Mike Ward
 : Lynn N. Rivers
 : Karen McCarthy
 : Chaka Fattah
 : Frank Mascara
 : Lloyd Doggett
 : Sheila Jackson Lee
 : Ken Bentsen Jr.

Republican seats held 
Republicans held 17 of their open seats.

 : John Shadegg
 : Andrea Seastrand
 : Sonny Bono
 : Mark Foley
 : Ray LaHood
 : Tom Latham
 : Bob Ehrlich
 : Rodney Frelinghuysen
 : Dan Frisa
 : Sue W. Kelly
 : Sue Myrick
 : Steve Largent
 : Wes Cooley
 : Phil English
 : Mark Sanford
 : Ed Bryant
 : Barbara Cubin

Special elections

Alabama

Alaska

Arizona

Arkansas

California

Colorado

Connecticut

Delaware

Florida

Georgia

Hawaii

Idaho

Illinois

Indiana

Iowa

Kansas

Kentucky

Louisiana

Maine

Maryland

Massachusetts

Michigan

Minnesota

Mississippi

Missouri

Montana

Nebraska

Nevada

New Hampshire

New Jersey

New Mexico

New York

North Carolina

North Dakota

Ohio

Oklahoma

Oregon

Pennsylvania

Rhode Island

South Carolina

South Dakota

Tennessee

Texas

Utah

Vermont

Virginia

Washington

West Virginia

Wisconsin

Wyoming

Non-voting delegates 

|-
! 
| Eleanor Holmes Norton
|  | Democratic
| 1990
| Incumbent re-elected.
| nowrap | 

|-
! 
| Ron de Lugo
|  | Democratic
| 1980
|  | Incumbent retired.New member elected.Independent gain.
| nowrap | 

|-
! 
| Robert A. Underwood
|  | Democratic
| 1992
| Incumbent re-elected.
| nowrap | 

|}

See also
 1994 United States elections
 1994 United States gubernatorial elections
 1994 United States Senate elections
 103rd United States Congress
 104th United States Congress
 Republican Revolution

References

Further reading

External links
 Statistics of the Congressional Election of November 8, 1994, Office of the Clerk U.S. House of Representatives